Jorge Castillo may refer to:

 Jorge Castillo (chef), Cuban-American chef and author
 Jorge Castillo (artist) (born 1933), Spanish surrealist painter and sculptor
 Jorge Castillo (rower) (born 1939), Mexican Olympic rower
 Jorge Del Castillo (born 1950), Peruvian lawyer and politician
 Jorge Olivera Castillo (born 1961), Cuban poet and dissident